Burhøns is the sixth LP album released 1979 by the Danish rock band Gnags. The album was released digitally remastered 1996 on CD.

Track listing 
All songs written and arranged by Gnags.
 Burhøns — 4:21
 Ugler i mosen — 3:15
 Pyramiden — 4:02
 Professionelle ballademagere — 3:03
 Alt hvad jeg ved — 3:05
 Ikke køre træt — 3:53
 En tiger fra zoo — 3:03
 Savner dig — 4:58
 Fugl på skinner — 4:09
 Nu, stjerne — 3:26

Personnel
Ivan Sørensen: Vocals, Guitars, Organ, Piano, Moog Synthesizers
Per Christian Frost: Guitars, Organ, Piano, Moog Synthesizers
Jacob Riis-Olsen: Vocals, Slide Guitar
Henning Stærk: Vocals, Harmonica, Bass, Drums, Percussion
Peter AG Nielsen: Vocals, Drums
Jens J. Nielsen: Vocals, Percussion

1979 albums
Gnags albums